Robert Walter Shirley, 12th Earl Ferrers (7 July 1894 – 11 October 1954), was a British Conservative politician and member of the House of Lords.

References

External links

1894 births
1954 deaths
Earls Ferrers
People educated at West Downs School
Conservative Party (UK) hereditary peers